The Embraer EMB 121 Xingu (pronounced "shingoo") is a twin-turboprop fixed-wing aircraft built by the Brazilian aircraft manufacturer, Embraer.  The design is based on the EMB 110 Bandeirante, using its wing and engine design merged with an all-new fuselage.  The EMB 121 first flew on 10 October 1976.

A modified form of the EMB 121, the EMB 121A1 Xingu II, was introduced on 4 September 1981 with a more powerful engine (PT6A-135), increased seating (8 or 9 passengers) and a larger fuel capacity.

Before production ceased in August 1987, Embraer had produced 106 EMB 121 aircraft, 51 of which were exported to countries outside Brazil. Currently, the French Air and Space Force is the largest operator with 23 aircraft still in service.

Variants

EMB 121A Xingu I  Pratt & Whitney Canada PT6A-28
EMB 121A1 Xingu II  Pratt & Whitney Canada PT6A-135
EMB 121B Xingu III  Projected stretched development, not proceeded with, to have been powered by Pratt & Whitney Canada PT6A-42 engines.
EMB 123 Tapajós  planned version with Pratt & Whitney Canada PT6A-45
VU-9  Brazilian Air Force designation

Military operators

  
 Brazilian Air Force
 
 French Air and Space Force
 French Navy

Specifications (EMB 121A1 Xingu II)

See also

References

Notes

Bibliography
 EMB-121 information at Airliners.net
 Endres, Gunter and Gething, Mike. (2002). Aircraft Recognition Guide, (2nd Ed.).  New York City: Harper Collins Publishers. .
 Michell, Simon (editor). Jane's Civil and Military Aircraft Updates 1994-95. Coulsdon, Surrey, UK:Jane's Information Group, 1994. .

External links

1970s Brazilian aircraft
Embraer aircraft
T-tail aircraft
Low-wing aircraft
Aircraft first flown in 1976
Twin-turboprop tractor aircraft